Frank Howard Card (December 28, 1944 – April 14, 2021) was an American basketball player who played five seasons in the American Basketball Association (ABA).

Born in Philadelphia, Pennsylvania, he played collegiately for the South Carolina State University.

He was selected by the Philadelphia 76ers in the 7th round (77th pick overall) of the 1967 NBA draft.

He played for the Minnesota Pipers (1968–69), Washington Caps (1969–70), Virginia Squires (1970–71), Carolina Cougars (1970–71) and Denver Rockets (1971–73) in the ABA for 306 games.

Following his retirement from basketball, Card worked for the Southeastern Pennsylvania Transit Authority for nearly 25 years. He died on April 14, 2021.

Early life and education 
Frank Howard Card was born to Catherine Cheers and Frank Card on December 28, 1944 in Philadelphia, PA. Card graduated from West Philadelphia High School and earned a scholarship to South Carolina State University. His passion in life at that time was to play basketball, and growing up he honed his skills on the playgrounds of his West Philly neighborhood.

Work and career 
Card served in the Army from April 1965 for three years.

During this time he started playing for the Baker League, where he became known for his jumping ability and earned the nick name “Watusi”. He went on to be selected by the 76ers in the 7th round of the 1967 NBA draft. He played for the Minnesota Pipers, Washington Caps, Virginia Squires, Carolina Cougars and Denver Rockets. He also played pro ball in Europe for several years. During that time he also served in the Army from April 1965 to April 1968.

Following his retirement from basketball, Card worked for the Southeastern Pennsylvania Transit Authority[SEPTA] for nearly 25 years.

Death and legacy 
Card was known for socializing and making friends. His infectious smile, energy and sense of humor was as big as he was. He mentored many of his younger male coworkers who often called him “Mr. Frank”. He showed respect to everyone he met and felt one of the most important jobs he ever had was being a positive role model and father to his two step sons. 

Card was honored at the ABA's 50th Anniversary for his professional achievements and a proud supporter of the Dropping Dimes Foundation.

References

External links

1944 births
2021 deaths
Allentown Jets players
American men's basketball players
Basketball players from Philadelphia
Camden Bullets players
Carolina Cougars players
Denver Rockets players
Minnesota Pipers players
Philadelphia 76ers draft picks
Power forwards (basketball)
Small forwards
South Carolina State Bulldogs basketball players
Virginia Squires players
Washington Caps players